Kaviya Thalaivi is a 1970 Indian Tamil-language film, written and directed by K. Balachander and produced by Sowcar Janaki. It is a remake of the 1963 Bengali film Uttar Falguni. Janaki also stars alongside Gemini Ganesan and M. R. R. Vasu. The film was released on 29 October 1970, Diwali day, and became a success. For his performance, Ganesan won the Tamil Nadu State Film Award for Best Actor.

Plot 

Devi is in love with Suresh, a lawyer, but is forced to marry Paranthaman, an alcoholic gambler. Devi escapes from him, and obtains work as a dancer in Hyderabad where she gives birth to a daughter named Krishna. When Vasu tries to kidnap the child, she has Suresh adopt her. Later, when Vasu's blackmail threatens Krishna's marriage, Devi kills him.

Cast 
 Gemini Ganesan as Suresh
 Sowcar Janaki as Devi and Krishna
 Ravichandran
 M. R. R. Vasu as Paranthaman
 S. Varalakshmi
 Lakshmi Prabha
 V. Nirmala
 Baby Dolly

Production 
Kaviya Thalaivi is a remake of the 1963 Bengali film Uttar Falguni, and was produced by Sowcar Janaki under the banner Selvi Films; she also starred in dual roles. The screenplay for the remake was written by K. Balachander, who also directed. Cinematography was handled by N. Balakrishnan, and the editing by N. R. Kittu.

Soundtrack 
The music was composed by M. S. Viswanathan, and the lyrics were written by Kannadasan. The song "Oru Naal Iravu" is set in the Carnatic raga known as Sumanesaranjani.

Release and reception 
Kaviya Thalaivi was released on 29 October 1970, Diwali day, and distributed by Sree Balaji Movies. The Indian Express wrote, "Sowcar Janaki in the dual role gives a sterling performance. Gemini Ganesh, after a long break, comes into his own and is highly satisfactory. K. Balachander's dialogue has flashes of brilliance." It emerged a commercial success, and Ganesan won the Tamil Nadu State Film Award for Best Actor.

Legacy 
Film historian Mohan Raman described Kaviya Thalaivi as one of Janaki's "exceptional performances". Janaki also named the film as among her personal favourites.

References

Bibliography

External links 

1970 films
1970 romantic drama films
1970s feminist films
1970s Tamil-language films
Films about women in India
Films directed by K. Balachander
Films scored by M. S. Viswanathan
Films set in Chennai
Films shot in Andhra Pradesh
Films with screenplays by K. Balachander
Indian black-and-white films
Indian feminist films
Indian romantic drama films
Tamil remakes of Bengali films